The Moonee Valley Vase is a registered Moonee Valley Racing Club Group 2 Thoroughbred horse race held under Set Weights conditions, for horses aged three-years-old, over a distance of 2040 metres. It is held at Moonee Valley Racecourse in Melbourne, Australia on W. S. Cox Plate Day.  Prize money is A$300,000.

History
The event is considered to be a major preparation race for the Group 1 Victoria Derby, the premier race for three-year-olds during the Melbourne Cup carnival.

Name
 1983–1989  - The Herald Vase
 1990  - Herald Sun Vase
 1991–1992  - BMW Vase
 1993–2011  - AAMI Vase
 2012–2013 - Mitchelton Wines Vase
 2014–2015 - Dilmah Exceptional Teas Vase
 2016 - LUCRF Super Vase
 2017 onwards - Drummond Golf Vase

Distance
 1983–1985 - 1600 metres
 1986 onwards  - 2040 metres

Grade
 1983–1988  - Listed race
 1989–1996  - Group 3 race
 1997 onwards  - Group 2 race

Double winners 
The following thoroughbreds have won the Moonee Valley Vase – Victoria Derby double.
Efficient (2006), Plastered (2004), Helenus (2002), Blevic (1994) and Raveneaux (1986)

The following thoroughbreds have won the Moonee Valley Vase – VRC Oaks double.
Jameka (2015)

Winners

 2021 - Forgot You
 2020 - Cherry Tortoni
 2019 - Soul Patch
 2018 - Stars of Carrum
 2017 - Aloisia
 2016 - Sacred Elixir
 2015 - Jameka
 2014 - Moonovermanhattan
 2013 - Savvy Nature
 2012 - Super Cool
 2011 - Manawanui
 2010 - Rekindled Interest
 2009 - Hanks
 2008 - Whobegotyou
 2007 - Marching
 2006 - Efficient
 2005 - Duelled
 2004 - Plastered
 2003 - Kempinsky
 2002 - Helenus
 2001 - Ustinov
 2000 - Skalato
 1999 - Diatribe
 1998 - Mossman
 1997 - Gold Guru
 1996 - Alfa
 1995 - Donar
 1994 - Blevic
 1993 - Zaremba
 1992 - Kenny's Best Pal
 1991 - Naturalism
 1990 - Rockets Galore
 1989 - Zamoff
 1988 - Big Grey Roo
 1987 - Crush
 1986 - Raveneaux
 1985 - Caledonian Boy
 1984 - Brash Son
 1983 - Centaine

See also
 List of Australian Group races
 Group races

References

Horse races in Australia
Flat horse races for three-year-olds